Chrysocale pava is a moth in the subfamily Arctiinae. It was described by Paul Dognin in 1893. It is found in Venezuela.

References

Moths described in 1893
Euchromiina